Kaj Johansen (2 November 1932 – 1 December 2018) was a Danish footballer who played as a right-back for Vejle Boldklub.

References

External links
 Profile at gravsted.dk

1932 births
2018 deaths
Danish men's footballers
Association football fullbacks
Vejle Boldklub players
Sportspeople from Aalborg